The 2020–21 North Texas Mean Green men's basketball team represented the University of North Texas during the 2020–21 NCAA Division I men's basketball season. The team was led by fifth-year head coach Grant McCasland, and played their home games at UNT Coliseum in Denton, Texas as a member of the West division of Conference USA. In a season limited due to the ongoing COVID-19 pandemic, they finished the season 18–10, 9–5 to finish in third place in the division. They defeated Middle Tennessee, Old Dominion, Louisiana Tech, and Western Kentucky to win the C-USA tournament championship. As a result, they received the conference's automatic bid to the NCAA tournament as the No. 13 seed in the South region. There they upset No. 4-seeded Purdue in the first round for the school’s first ever NCAA tournament victory, before losing to No. 5-seeded Villanova in the second round.

Previous season 
The Mean Green finished the 2019–20 season 20–11, 14–4 in C-USA play to finish to win the regular season championship. Before postseason play could begin, the C-USA tournament and other postseason tournaments were canceled due to the COVID-19 pandemic.

Roster

Schedule and results

|-
!colspan=12 style=|Non-conference regular season

|-
!colspan=12 style=|CUSA regular season

|-
!colspan=12 style=| Conference USA tournament

|-
!colspan=12 style=| NCAA tournament

See also
 2020–21 North Texas Mean Green women's basketball team

Notes

References

North Texas Mean Green men's basketball seasons
North Texas Mean Green
North Texas men's basketball
North Texas men's basketball
North Texas